Gabriele Araudo (born August 5, 1974, in Carmagnola) is an Italian ice sledge hockey player.

He was part of the Italian sledge hockey team at the 2010 Winter Paralympics in Vancouver, Canada.

He was on the Italian team at the 2011 IPC Ice Sledge Hockey European Championships.

References

External links
 Ritratto di Gabriele Araudo, portiere filosofo della nazionale di Ice sledge hockey (Italian), superabile.it, March 19, 2010
 Portiere filosofo della nazionale (Italian), toriseduti.org, March 2010
 

1974 births
Living people
Italian sledge hockey players
Paralympic sledge hockey players of Italy
Ice sledge hockey players at the 2010 Winter Paralympics
Ice sledge hockey players at the 2014 Winter Paralympics
Para ice hockey players at the 2018 Winter Paralympics
Para ice hockey players at the 2022 Winter Paralympics